Zheng Ji (died 49 BC), born in Shaoxing, Zhejiang, was a general during Han Dynasty, and served the first Protector General of the Western Regions in 60 BC.

See also
Battle of Jushi

References
Li, Bingquan and Zhao, Hongyan. "Handai Shouren Xiyu Duhu Zheng Ji" ("The First Protector General of the Western Regions Zheng Ji"). Chinese Literature and History. 2004.12. .

Han dynasty generals
Year of birth unknown
People from East China
1st-century BC Chinese people
49 BC deaths